The 1931–32 international cricket season was from September 1931 to April 1932.

Season overview

November

South Africa in Australia

February

England in Jamaica

South Africa in New Zealand

References

International cricket competitions by season
1931 in cricket
1932 in cricket